Boynuyaralı Mehmed Pasha (died 1665 in Eyüp, Istanbul), also known as Boynueğri Mehmed Pasha, was an Ottoman statesman. He was grand vizier of the Ottoman Empire from 26 April 1656 to 15 September 1656.

Mehmed Pasha fought in the Ottoman–Safavid War of 1623–39 under sultan Murad IV. He was wounded in the neck during a battle, earning him the epithets boynuyaralı ("wounded-neck" in Turkish) and boynueğri ("crooked-neck"). As a Sergeant General in his youth, he was involved in the execution of the satirist poet Nef'i.

See also
 List of Ottoman Grand Viziers

References

17th-century Grand Viziers of the Ottoman Empire
1665 deaths
1578 births